Alfred William Hill (29 July 1865 – 27 May 1936) was an English cricketer.  Hill was a left-handed batsman who bowled right-arm off break.  He was born at Little Rissington, Gloucestershire.

Hill made his first-class debut for Gloucestershire against the touring South Africans in 1904.  In this match he took his only first-class wicket, that of William Shalders, for the cost of 47 runs from 10 overs.  With the bat, he ended Gloucestershire's first-innings unbeaten on 29, while in their second-innings he was dismissed for a single run by Charlie Llewellyn.  The following year he played his second and final first-class match for Gloucestershire, against Nottinghamshire in the 1905 County Championship.  In this match, he bowled 3 wicket-less overs and wasn't required to bat.

He died at Bourton-on-the-Water, Gloucestershire, on 27 May 1936.

References

External links
Alfred Hill at ESPNcricinfo
Alfred Hill at CricketArchive

1865 births
1936 deaths
People from Cotswold District
English cricketers
Gloucestershire cricketers
Sportspeople from Gloucestershire